Ute Pass may refer to:
 Ute Pass (Medicine Bow Mountains), a mountain pass in the Medicine Bow Mountains of Colorado, United States.
 Ute Pass (Park Range), a mountain pass on the Continental Divide of the Americas in the Park Range of Colorado, United States.
 Ute Pass (Rampart Range), a mountain pass in the Rampart Range of Colorado, United States.
 Ute Pass (Sawatch Range), a mountain pass in the Far Southern Sawatch Range of Colorado, United States.
 Ute Pass (Williams Fork Mountains), a mountain pass in the Williams Fork Mountains of Colorado, United States.

See also